Lucila Santos Trujillo (b. 1925/1928 – d. 4 May 2020) was First Lady of Ecuador to Otto Arosemena from 16 November 1966 to 31 August 1968.

Biography
Santos was born in Portoviejo, the daughter of Atanasio Santos Chávez, Governor of Manabí Province, and Lucila Trujillo Gutiérrez.

In 1947, she married Otto Arosemena in Guayaquil, and the couple had three children. In 1955, they acquired a neocolonial property in Guayaquil and named it Villa Lucile. They sold the property in 1962 and moved to Quito, where Arosemena had been living since 1957 for his political offices. When he became President of Ecuador in 1966, Santos likewise became First Lady and the host of Carondelet Palace during her husband's presidency.

In addition to the First Lady's traditional role as president of the National Institute for Children and the Family, Santos promoted the "One School a Day" program, which built schools across Ecuador. She died in Guayaquil.

References

Date of birth missing
1920s births
2020 deaths
First ladies of Ecuador
People from Portoviejo